Anisacanthus is a genus of flowering plants in the bear's breeches family, Acanthaceae. The generic name is derived from the Greek words ανισος (anisos), meaning "unequal," and ακανθος (acanthos), meaning "thorn." Members of the genus are native to tropical and subtropical regions of the Americas. They are commonly known as desert honeysuckles, though this term is shared with the genus Ancistranthus, and is something of a misnomer as true honeysuckles (genus Lonicera) belong to the family Caprifoliaceae. Anisacanthus species are sometimes cultivated for use in xeriscaping.

Species

References

External links

Acanthaceae
Acanthaceae genera